The 2018 NASCAR K&N Pro Series West was the sixty-fifth season of the K&N Pro Series West, a regional stock car racing series sanctioned by NASCAR. It began with the Bakersfield 175 presented by NAPA Auto Parts at Kern County Raceway Park on March 15 and concluded with the NAPA Auto Parts 175 presented by West Coast Stock Car Hall of Fame at Kern County Raceway Park on October 27. Todd Gilliland entered the season as the defending Drivers' champion; however, he did not go for three in a row, because he moved up to the Truck Series in 2018. Derek Thorn, the 2013 West Series champion, won his second championship in his first full season since his first title, 27 points in front of his Sunrise Ford Racing teammate Ryan Partridge, who also returned to the series in 2018 after a year off in 2017.

Drivers

Notes

Schedule
On December 11, 2017, NASCAR announced the 2018 schedule. The two races at Irwindale were dropped from the schedule in favor of a second race at Tucson and a race at Gateway. The Las Vegas Motor Speedway dirt track was added to the schedule, marking the series' first race on dirt since 1979 at Ascot Park. All races in the season are televised on NBCSN on a tape delay basis.

Notes

The race at Spokane County Raceway, originally scheduled for 15 July, was cancelled and would not be replaced.

Results and standings

Races

Notes
1 – Starting grid was set by the fastest lap times from the first Port of Tucson Twin 100 race.
2 – The qualifying session for the Monaco Gateway Classic was cancelled due to weather. The starting line-up was decided by Practice results.

Drivers' championship

(key) Bold – Pole position awarded by time. Italics – Pole position set by final practice results or Owners' points. * – Most laps led.

Notes
‡ – Non-championship round.
1 – Bill Kann and Hershel McGriff received championship points, despite the fact that they did not start the race.
2 – Scored points towards the K&N Pro Series East.

See also

2018 Monster Energy NASCAR Cup Series
2018 NASCAR Xfinity Series
2018 NASCAR Camping World Truck Series
2018 NASCAR K&N Pro Series East
2018 NASCAR Whelen Modified Tour
2018 NASCAR Pinty's Series
2018 NASCAR PEAK Mexico Series
2018 NASCAR Whelen Euro Series

References

External links

ARCA Menards Series West